Mehrangiz Dowlatshahi (13 December 1919 – 11 October 2008) was an Iranian social activist and politician, who held significant positions, including ambassador of Iran to Denmark during the Pahlavi era. She also served as a member of the Majlis for three terms.

Early life and education
Her family were major land owners based in Kermanshah and were progressive aristocrats. Her father was Mohammad Ali Mirza (also known as Meshkout Al Dowleh), majlis member and land owner. He was a member of the Qajar dynasty. Her mother was Akhtar ol-Mulk, daughter of Hidayat Quli Khan. Mehrangiz was the cousin of Esmat Dowlatshahi, fourth wife of Reza Shah.

Concerning the birth date and birth place of Dowlatshahi there are some conflicting reports which were stated by herself. Abbas Milani states that she gave two different birth years, 1917 and 1919. The same is also reported by Abbas Milani in regard to her birth city, which was given as both Tehran and Isfahan. 

Mehrangiz was one of the first Iranian girls who attended a co-education kindergarten. Then she graduated from the Zoroastrian School in Tehran. She held a bachelor's degree from Berlin University. She received a PhD in social and political sciences from Heidelberg University.

Career
Dowlatshahi worked at the social services organization and at the organization for support of prisoners. She established Rah-e No (New Way) society, which later became part of the International Women's Syndicate. The society offered training to women and advocated equal rights for them. She also launched adult literacy programs in southern Tehran. In 1951, she and woman activist Safeyeh Firouz met Mohammad Reza Shah to discuss the electoral rights of women in Iran. She was the director of the advisory committee on international affairs of the Women's Organization of Iran (WOI). In 1973, she was appointed president of the International Council of Women and her term ended in 1976.

She was elected to the Majlis in 1963, being one of six female deputies. She served there until 1975. She represented Kermanshah at the Majlis for three terms. She significantly contributed to the passing of the family protection law in 1967 and to its expansion in 1974. She also served as the first minister of women affairs. She was also the first woman ambassador of Imperial Iran to Denmark. She was appointed to the post in 1975.

Later years and death
Dowlatshahi was serving as the Iranian ambassador in Denmark when the 1979 revolution occurred. Soon after this incident she left the country and settled in Paris. In 2002, she published a book entitled Society, Government, and Iran’s Women’s Movement. She died in Paris in October 2008.

Awards and honors
  Grand Cross of the Order of the Dannebrog (Denmark; 14 February 1979)

In 1997, Dowlatshahi was named as the woman of the year by the Iranian Women's Studies Foundation in the United States.

References

External links

20th-century Iranian women politicians
21st-century Iranian women writers
1919 births
2008 deaths
Ambassadors of Iran to Denmark
Exiles of the Iranian Revolution in France
Grand Crosses of the Order of the Dannebrog
Heidelberg University alumni
Humboldt University of Berlin alumni
Iranian emigrants to France
Iran Novin Party politicians
Iranian women activists
Iranian women ambassadors
Iranian women's rights activists
Leaders of organizations
Members of the 21st Iranian Majlis
Members of the 22nd Iranian Majlis
Members of the 23rd Iranian Majlis
Politicians from Isfahan
People of the Iranian Revolution
Qajar princesses
Rastakhiz Party politicians
Government ministers of Iran